^txt2regex$ is a regular expression wizard that leads the user through the construction of a regular expression by asking a series of questions. The regular expression is generated in the notation used by awk, ed, egrep, Emacs, expect, find,  grep, lex, Lisp, MySQL, OpenOffice.org, Perl, PHP, PostgreSQL, Procmail, Python, Sed, Tcl, VBscript, Vi, and Vim. It is a useful tool for users with little or no knowledge of regular expressions and so is included in several Linux distributions, including Debian, Fedora, Gentoo, Knoppix, and Mandriva, in FreeBSD, and in Fink for Mac OS X.

Although graphical interfaces have typically followed command line interfaces, ^txt2regex$ is unusual in providing a command line interface for a function usually, and previously, provided by means of a graphical user interface. It is also unusual in interacting with the user to facilitate the use of what is generally regarded as a technical tool unsuitable for naive users and in supporting multiple regular expression notations. ^txt2regex$ is a bash script.

References

External links 
 

Programming tools